Eudalaca albistriata is a species of moth of the family Hepialidae. It is known from South Africa and Lesotho.

References

External links
Hepialidae genera

Moths described in 1910
Hepialidae
Moths of Africa
Fauna of Lesotho